Bulbophyllum sect. Plumata is a section of the genus Bulbophyllum.

Description
Species in this section have denticulate petal margins.

Distribution
Plants from this section are found in Southeast Asia.

Species
Bulbophyllum section Plumata comprises the following species:

References

Orchid subgenera